The Ovation Awards are a Southern California award for excellence in theatre, established in 1989. They are given out by the non-profit arts service organization LA Stage Alliance and are the only peer-judged theatre awards in Los Angeles. Winners are selected by a voting committee of Los Angeles area theater professionals who are selected through an application process every year. The Ovation Awards ceremony has been held at different theatres throughout the Los Angeles area, including the Ahmanson Theatre and the Orpheum Theatre. Hosts for the ceremonies have included Nathan Lane, Lily Tomlin, and Neil Patrick Harris.

Eligibility

 The producer(s) must be a qualifying member of LA Stage Alliance.
 Productions must meet one or more of the following requirements: Include a director who is a full member of The Society of Stage Directors and Choreographers (SDC), a designer who is a full member of United Scenic Artists (USA), or an actor who is a full member of Actors' Equity Association (AEA), or the producer(s) has previously produced an Ovation Award nominated production in the previous three seasons.
 In addition, eligible productions must meet the minimum number of performances, currently ten for intimate theatres and six for larger theatres.
 Productions in venues with more than 100 seats which include no members of any theatrical union, and those produced by companies that are currently involved in a union labor strike are ineligible.

Categories

Production
Musical – Large Theatre
Musical – Intimate Theatre (Franklin R. Levy Award)
Play – Large Theatre
Play – Intimate Theatre
Touring Production

Performance
Lead Actress in a Musical
Lead Actor in a Musical
Featured Actress in a Musical
Featured Actor in a Musical
Lead Actress in a Play
Lead Actor in a Play
Featured Actress in a Play
Featured Actor in a Play
Ensemble Performance
Solo Performance (Ray Stricklyn Memorial Award)

Direction/Choreography/Design
Direction of a Musical
Direction of a Play
Choreography
Music Direction
Set Design – Large Theatre
Set Design – Intimate Theatre
Lighting Design – Large Theatre
Lighting Design – Intimate Theatre
Sound Design – Large Theatre
Sound Design – Intimate Theatre
Costume Design – Large Theatre
Costume Design – Intimate Theatre

Writing/Composition
Playwriting of an Original Play
Books/Lyrics/Music for an Original Musical

Ceremony mistake
During the 2021 Ovation Awards ceremony, actress Jully Lee's first name was mispronounced and she was misidentified with a photograph of a different Asian American actress. In response, several participating theatre companies revoked their membership in the LA Stage Alliance, citing the organization's disenfranchisement of Asian Americans and Pacific Islanders (AAPI) as well as people of color (BIPOC) from the Los Angeles theatre community.

Lists of winners
 2007 Ovation Awards
 2008 Ovation Awards
 2009 Ovation Awards
 2010 Ovation Awards
 2011 Ovation Awards
 2012 Ovation Awards
 2013 Ovation Awards
 2014 Ovation Awards
 2015 Ovation Awards
 2016 Ovation Awards

References

External links
The LA Stage Alliance Ovation Awards 

 
Award ceremonies
Awards established in 1989